Malcolm Francis Hickman (born 30 June 1936) is a former English cricketer.  Hickman was a right-handed batsman.  He was born at Market Harborough, Leicestershire.

Hickman made his first-class debut for Leicestershire against Glamorgan in the 1954 County Championship.  He made eleven further first-class appearances for the county, the last of which came against Kent in the 1957 County Championship.  In his twelve first-class appearances for the county, he scored 132 runs at an average of 11.60, with a high score of 40.

References

External links
Malcolm Hickman at ESPNcricinfo
Malcolm Hickman at CricketArchive

1936 births
Living people
People from Market Harborough
Cricketers from Leicestershire
English cricketers
Leicestershire cricketers